In mathematics, a weak Maass form is a smooth function  on the upper half plane, transforming like a modular form under the action of the modular group, being an eigenfunction of the corresponding hyperbolic Laplace operator, and having at most linear exponential growth at the cusps. If the eigenvalue of  under the Laplacian is zero, then  is called a harmonic weak Maass form, or briefly a harmonic Maass form.

A weak Maass form which has actually moderate growth at the cusps is a classical Maass wave form.

The Fourier expansions of harmonic Maass forms often encode interesting combinatorial, arithmetic, or geometric generating functions. Regularized theta lifts of harmonic Maass forms can be used to construct Arakelov Green functions for special divisors on orthogonal Shimura varieties.

Definition
A complex-valued smooth function  on the upper half-plane  is called a weak Maass form of integral weight  (for the group ) if it satisfies the following three conditions:

(1) For every matrix  the function  satisfies the modular transformation law

(2)  is an eigenfunction of the weight  hyperbolic Laplacian

where 

(3)  has at most linear exponential growth at the cusp, that is, there exists a constant  such that  as 

If  is a weak Maass form with eigenvalue 0 under , that is, if , then  is called a harmonic weak Maass form, or briefly a harmonic Maass form.

Basic properties
Every harmonic Maass form  of weight  has a Fourier expansion of the form

denotes the incomplete gamma function (which has to be interpreted appropriately when ). The first summand is called the holomorphic part, and the second summand is called the non-holomorphic part of 

There is a complex anti-linear differential operator  defined by

Since , the image of a harmonic Maass form is weakly holomorphic. Hence,  defines a map from the vector space  of harmonic Maass forms of weight  to the space  of weakly holomorphic modular forms of weight  It was proved by Bruinier and Funke (for arbitrary weights, multiplier systems, and congruence subgroups) that this map is surjective. Consequently, there is an exact sequence

providing a link to the algebraic theory of modular forms.

If harmonic Maass forms are interpreted as harmonic sections of the line bundle of modular forms of weight  equipped with the Petersson metric over the modular curve, then this differential operator can be viewed as a composition of the Hodge star operator and the antiholomorphic differential. The notion of harmonic Maass forms naturally generalizes to arbitrary congruence subgroups and (scalar and vector valued) multiplier systems.

Examples
 Every weakly holomorphic modular form is a harmonic Maass form.
 The non-holomorphic Eisenstein series

of weight 2 is a harmonic Maass form of weight 2.
 Zagier's Eisenstein series  of weight 3/2 is a harmonic Maass form of weight 3/2 (for the group ). Its image under  is a non-zero multiple of the Jacobi theta function

 The derivative of the incoherent Eisenstein series of weight 1 associated to an imaginary quadratic order is a harmonic Maass forms of weight 1.
 A mock modular form is the holomorphic part of a harmonic Maass form.
 Poincaré series built with the M-Whittaker function are weak Maass forms. When the spectral parameter is specialized to the harmonic point they lead to harmonic Maass forms.
 The simultaneous generating series for the values on Heegner divisors and integrals along geodesic cycles of Klein's J-function (normalized such that the constant term vanishes) is a harmonic Maass form of weight 1/2.

History
The above abstract definition of harmonic Maass forms together with a systematic investigation of their basic properties was first given by Bruinier and Funke. However, many examples, such as Eisenstein series and Poincaré series, had already been known earlier. Independently, Zwegers developed a theory of mock modular forms which also connects to harmonic Maass forms.

An algebraic theory of integral weight harmonic Maass forms in the style of Katz was developed by Candelori.

Citations

Works cited

Further reading

Automorphic forms
Modular forms